Remember December is the first EP and Christmas album by Canadian country music group Doc Walker. The album was released on November 7, 2011.

Track listing

References

2011 EPs
Doc Walker albums
Open Road Recordings EPs
2011 Christmas albums
Christmas albums by Canadian artists
Country Christmas albums